Cando Municipal Airport  is a public airport located one mile (1.6 km) west of the central business district of Cando, North Dakota, in Towner County, North Dakota, United States. It is owned by the Cando Airport Authority.

Facilities and aircraft

For the 12-month period ending July 8, 1998, the airport had 3,550 aircraft operations: 99% general aviation and 1% air taxi.

References

External links

Airports in North Dakota
Buildings and structures in Towner County, North Dakota
Transportation in Towner County, North Dakota